Russell Evans may refer to: 
Russell Evans (cricketer) (1965–2017), English cricketer
Russell Evans (pastor), senior pastor of Planetshakers Church
Red Evans (Russell Evans), baseball pitcher

See also
Russell Evans Smith